The Mahotella Queens is a South African female band formed in 1964 by music producer Rupert Bopape, consisting of Hilda Tloubatla, Nobesuthu Mbadu, and Amanda Nkosi. The group is noted for their distinct vocal harmony sound, guitar-led mbaqanga music, and fast stage dancing.

Bopape was a talent scout and producer at the independent Gallo Africa's subsidiary dedicated to black music, Mavuthela Music Company. He formed the Mahotella Queens as the company's resident girl group and the ensemble, often led by the deep-voiced male vocals of Simon 'Mahlathini' Nkabinde, went on to have many hit records during the 1960s. The Queens line-up during this period usually comprised Hilda Tloubatla, Juliet Mazamisa, Ethel Mngomezulu, Nobesuthu Mbadu and Mildred Mangxola. The Queens and Mahlathini were backed by Mavuthela's house band, the Makgona Tsohle Band (including Marks Mankwane on lead guitar and West Nkosi on alto saxophone). In 1972 the line-up of the Mahotella Queens disintegrated after royalty disagreements with Bopape; Mahlathini left the company in a similar dispute with the producer. However, with a change of membership, the Queens remained productive and popular into the 1970s and 1980s. In 1987, following the explosion of interest in South African music, the Queens line-up was rejigged and three of its original singers – Hilda Tloubatla, Nobesuthu Mbadu and Mildred Mangxola – returned to the group. In combination with Mahlathini, the group forged a successful international touring career that lasts to this day.

In spite of the deaths of Mahlathini, Marks Mankwane and West Nkosi during the late 1990s, the Mahotella Queens continue to perform and record in the 21st century. In 2013, long-serving member Mildred Mangxola retired from the group. She was replaced by a new recruit, Amanda Nkosi. Nobesuthu Mbadu died in 2021.

History

1964 – 1972
Initially, Rupert Bopape formed a team of female singers that would record songs under various group pseudonyms. Some of the most successful early recordings had been issued with the same name, Mahotella Queens, and it was this name that became the most recognisable to listeners. The line-up of the group would consist of five singers taken from a larger pool of vocalists that included Hilda Tloubatla, Juliet Mazamisa, Ethel and Francisca Mngomezulu, Mildred Mangxola, Nobesuthu Mbadu, Windy Sibeko, Mary Rabotapi (formerly of vocal group The Skylarks) and Nunu Maseko.

The music produced by the combination of Mahlathini, the Mahotella Queens and the Makgona Tsohle Band developed heavily on the familiar mbaqanga sound, a type of jive music that fused traditional and modern elements together and played on electric instrumentation. Their take on this music evolved into a unique style referred to as "mgqashiyo", featuring up-tempo female harmony combined with powerful male bass vocal. Mahlathini became well known in his own right as a groaner, the name given to male lead singers with particularly deep and "groaning" vocals.

The group would have hit singles throughout the 1960s, including "Thoko", "Sithunyiwe", "Pitsa Tse Kgolo", "Ngikhala Ngiyabaleka" and "Izulu Liyaduduma". Some of their most successful singles were compiled onto albums such as Meet the Mahotella Queens (their first LP), Indoda Mahlathini, Marena, Marks Umthakathi and Umculo Kawupheli.

1972 – 1987
In 1972, Mahlathini and several of the Queens members departed the group following royalty disputes with Rupert Bopape. Many of the members joined rival groups such as Izintombi Zesi Manje Manje. Mahlathini moved to another record company where he recorded with a new group of vocalists, titled simply The Queens, and backed by a new instrumental band. Bopape worked with the members of the Makgona Tsohle Band to replace the members of the Mahotella Queens who had departed. The newer line-up consisted of Emily Zwane, Beatrice Ngcobo, Thandi Radebe, Thandi Nkosi and Caroline Kapentar. In 1972, West Nkosi was promoted by Bopape to a producing role. One of his early productions was a then-unknown choir, Ladysmith Black Mambazo.

The Mahotella Queens continued to record and perform successfully throughout the 1970s, on many occasions in combination with groaner Robert 'Mbazo' Mkhize, who was also the lead vocalist of Mavuthela's successful male group Abafana Baseqhudeni. Guitarist Marks Mankwane became the producer of the Queens following the retirement of Rupert Bopape in the late 1970s. The group's material included albums like Izibani Zomgqashiyo, Tsamaya Moratuoa, Thatha Izimpahla Zakho, Ezesimanje and Tsa Lebowa. During the 1980s, the Queens' popularity dipped as a result of changing musical tastes, and mbaqanga was eventually usurped as the favoured music of the townships by styles such as soul and disco.

1987 – 1999
In 1983, Mankwane reunited Mahlathini with five of the original Mahotella Queens for a spin-off group titled Mahlathini Nezintombi Zomgqashiyo. However, the decline of mbaqanga music meant that the project lasted only a year. Mankwane continued to produce the Mahotella Queens while Mahlathini decided to join forces with the West Nkosi-produced trio Amaswazi Emvelo, one of the only mbaqanga groups to remain well-selling and popular. During the mid-1980s, a stream of Western musical projects involving the music of South Africa helped to reestablish the original line-up of the Mahotella Queens in combination with Mahlathini. These included the seminal compilation The Indestructible Beat of Soweto and Paul Simon's Graceland album. In 1987, West Nkosi convinced Mankwane to bring the Queens under his production, and the line-up was completely reformed: the then-membership of the Queens was replaced by three singers associated with the group during its original 1960s heyday – Hilda Tloubatla, Nobesuthu Mbadu and Mildred Mangxola. Together with Mahlathini and most of the original Makgona Tsohle Band, the Queens recorded their first album aimed at the international audience, Thokozile. It was successful enough to attract overseas promoters and the group – now billed as Mahlathini and the Mahotella Queens – subsequently began a long international touring career, with a successful debut performance in France at the Angouleme Festival. In 1988, the group performed at the tribute concert held in recognition of Nelson Mandela's 70th birthday at London's Wembley Stadium. Mahlathini and the Mahotella Queens continued to record successful albums including Paris - Soweto, Mbaqanga, Rhythm and Art, Stoki Stoki and Umuntu. In 1991, producer West Nkosi left the group to continue producing music for the South African audience. Marks Mankwane returned to producing Mahlathini and the Mahotella Queens, as well as continuing to play lead guitar for the group.

1999 – present
Due to health problems stemming from a long-standing diabetic condition, Mahlathini gave his last performance with the Mahotella Queens in 1997. The year after, former producer West Nkosi was killed in a car crash. On the day of his funeral, guitarist and producer Marks Mankwane died due to complications with diabetes. Mahlathini and the Mahotella Queens decided to continue in tribute to their deceased band members, recording the album Umuntu in early 1999. During the production of the album, Mahlathini's health deteriorated further. He died in July 1999 following several months of ill health.

After a period of mourning, the Mahotella Queens decided to return to the music industry. They recorded a new album in 2000 titled Sebai Bai, a successful release praised by the international audience and dedicated to Mahlathini, Mankwane and Nkosi. Some of the musicians joining the Queens on the new album included Victor Mkhize on lead guitar, Madoda Ntshingila on bass and Regis Gizavo on accordion. The Queens also continued to tour, with performances in the United States through 2002 and 2003. In 2004, the group released an experimental album aimed at a younger audience, Bazobuya, fusing their familiar mgqashiyo sound with modern beats.

In 2005, the Queens released Reign & Shine, another album that departed from their usual sound, featuring a cappella performances backed by traditional percussionist Veli Shabangu and sporadic guitar from their backing band. Accompanied by Shabangu, the group toured the United Kingdom as the support act for Ladysmith Black Mambazo between May and June 2006. In combination with their complete backing band, the Queens also headlined WOMAD 2006 in July.

In 2007, the Mahotella Queens released a gospel album titled Siyadumisa. The recording featured modern versions of traditional Zulu hymns. The group completed a tour of Europe on 25 August 2007 in which they performed their new material at various WOMAD festivals. The Queens also performed at venues in South Africa during late 2007 and 2008.

The Queens appeared as part of Pee Wee Ellis's show Still Black, Still Proud: An African Tribute to James Brown during 2010. South African jazz artist Hugh Masekela joined forces with the Mahotella Queens for a special UK tour for November 2010. Their performance in London's Southbank Centre was completely sold out.

In 2013, the Mahotella Queens took part in a competition to find the theme song for the MTN 8 football tournament. They recorded a modern version of one of their best-known hits, "Gazette/Kazet", accompanied by male singer Zamo and Kwaito star Brickz.

In 2016 the group returned to mainstream success after being featured on rapper Cassper Nyovest's hit "Malome".

Discography

The Mahotella Queens are prolific recording artists, dating back to the hundreds of recordings produced at Gallo-Mavuthela during their heyday in the 1960s and 1970s. The Queens remained with Gallo until 2005 when they joined an independent company led by former Gallo director Antos Stella. Despite the fact that the Queens recorded phenomenally throughout their career, only some of their older material is available to purchase. Most of the available material comprise recordings made after the late 1980s for the international audience.

See also
 Mahlathini
 Makgona Tsohle Band
 Mahlathini and the Mahotella Queens

References
 Afropop! An Illustrated Guide to Contemporary African Music by Sean Barlow & Banning Eyre. (Book Sales August 1995) ,

Notes

External links
 Mahotella Queens on Afropop Worldwide
 
 

Mahlathini and the Mahotella Queens members
Musical groups established in 1964
Professional a cappella groups
Mbaqanga
South African musical groups
Wrasse Records artists
All-female bands
Label Bleu artists
1964 establishments in South Africa